Charles David Baldwin (born March 22, 1955) is an American football coach. He served as the head football coach at California State University, Northridge from 1995 to 1996 and at San Jose State University from 1997 to 2000. Baldwin was also the interim head football coach at Colorado State University for 2014 Las Vegas Bowl.

Coaching career
Baldwin has served as a graduate assistant coach at Cal State Northridge, the offensive coordinator at Cincinnati, and the offensive coordinator at Baylor. Following San Jose State, he served as the offensive coordinator at Michigan State, New Mexico and Utah State.

Baldwin was the head football coach at Cal State Northridge from 1995 to 1996, compiling a record of 9–12. He was also the head football coach at San Jose State.

During his tenure as head coach at San Jose State from 1997 to 2000, he had three straight wins over Stanford (including in their Rose Bowl season of 1999). In 1997, SJSU upset No. 24 Air Force, (25–22) their first win over a ranked opponent since 1990. In 2000, SJSU beat ninth-ranked TCU (27–24) ending their 12-game winning streak. Also in 2000, SJSU earned a mark of 7–5, their first winning season in eight years. His overall record at San Jose State University was 18–27.

Baldwin served as the offensive coordinator for the Colorado State Rams of Colorado State University from 2012 until 2014. He also was the interim head coach for the Rams during the 2014 Las Vegas Bowl, following Jim McElwain's departure for the University of Florida. On December 20, 2014, following the Bowl Game, Baldwin along with the entire coaching staff received their termination papers.

In 2015, Baldwin joined Oregon State as offensive coordinator and tight ends coach under Gary Andersen. The following season, Baldwin left his duties as offensive coordinator and became the inside receivers coach. He later became tight ends coach in 2017. Baldwin and other assistant coaches were fired on November 26, 2017 as Oregon State continued its coaching search, over a month after Andersen resigned and Cory Hall took over as interim head coach.

Personal
Baldwin is married and has three children.

In 2015, Baldwin disclosed he has been drinking 16 to 18 cans of Diet Coke a day for over 15 years.

Head coaching record

Junior college

College

* Interim HC for bowl game

References

External links
 Northern Colorado profile
 Oregon State profile
 New Mexico profile
 Cincinnati profile

1955 births
Living people
Baylor Bears football coaches
Cal State Northridge Matadors football coaches
Cincinnati Bearcats football coaches
Colorado State Rams football coaches
Michigan State Spartans football coaches
New Mexico Lobos football coaches
Oregon State Beavers football coaches
San Jose State Spartans football coaches
Stanford Cardinal football coaches
Santa Rosa Bear Cubs football coaches
Utah State Aggies football coaches
Santa Barbara City Vaqueros football coaches
California State University, Northridge alumni
Granada Hills Charter High School alumni
Saint Mary's College of California alumni
Players of American football from Denver
People from Granada Hills, Los Angeles
Coaches of American football from California